Bharati Vidyapeeth University Medical College, Pune or BVDU Medical College, Pune  is a medical college located in Pune, Maharashtra. This institute is a constituent college of Bharati Vidyapeeth. The institute has 100 undergraduate seats for MBBS course.

References

External links
 

Universities in Maharashtra
Deemed universities in Maharashtra
Medical colleges in Maharashtra
Universities and colleges in Pune
Affiliates of Maharashtra University of Health Sciences
Educational institutions established in 1989
1989 establishments in Maharashtra